Irene Hasenberg Butter (Berlin, 1930), is a German-American Professor Emeritus in Economic Sciences at the University of Michigan and a Holocaust survivor.

As a German Jew, she survived a dramatic journey from Berlin to the United States via the Westerbork and Bergen-Belsen camps in her youth. Thanks to a prisoner exchange arranged by her father, she was able to leave the last concentration camp with her family to journey to Switzerland, France and Algeria at the end of 1945 and went eventually to the United States.

Biography 
Irene Hasenberg and her brother Werner were born in Berlin, Germany to John and Gertrude Hasenberg. They were a family of bankers including her father and his grandfather before him. The small family practiced Reformed Judaism and were fully assimilated into the local culture and considered themselves German.

Amsterdam 
In 1937, her father’s bank was taken away from him "because of its Jewish ownership" and soon other assaults followed, which caused her father to move his family to Amsterdam, Holland in December 1937.

However, when the German forces invaded the Netherlands in 1940, new hostilities against Dutch Jews followed and her father made arrangements to get foreign travel documents from a Swedish businessman, an effort that paid off in the weeks that followed.

Detention camps 
Before the new passports arrived, German occupiers deported the Hasenberg family from Amsterdam to nearby Westerbork transit camp in February 1944. In the camp, Irene Butter reconnected with some acquaintances from the Jewish neighborhood where she had lived in Amsterdam, including her friend Hanneli Goslar as well as Hanneli's close friend Anne Frank. 

It was in Westerbork that Butter's father received a package forwarded from his Amsterdam address containing Ecuadorian travel documents for each member of the family. Because they had acquired safe new national identities, they were moved from Westerbork to a special section of Bergen-Belsen camp for foreigners and from there they were sent to Switzerland as part of an exchange for German citizens. However, Irene's father died before leaving Germany from injuries inflicted by his Bergen-Belsen captors.

Irene was fourteen and weighed only seventy-nine pounds when she was sent to an Algerian refugee camp of the United Nations Relief and Rehabilitation Agency, where she could eat and recover from her mental and physical hardship. With the help of American relatives, she was sent to the United States and on Christmas eve of 1945, she arrived in Baltimore, Maryland. Six months later she was reunited with her mother Gertrude and brother Werner, who made the crossing from Europe to the United States by plane.

United States 
Armed with a college scholarship, Irene focused on her education and attended Queens College in New York. She then earned a Ph.D. in economics from Duke University at Durham, North Carolina. While studying at Duke, she met and married fellow student Charlie Butter and they had two children. Upon graduation, Irene and her family moved to the University of Michigan where she became a professor of economics and published many journal articles related to her research.

Peace activities during retirement 
After her arrival in the US, Irene was told that it would be wise to keep silent about the Holocaust and her war experiences in Germany and the Netherlands, but when her high school daughter Pamela proposed a school project in 1976 about Irene's war experiences, Butter relented and told her stories to Pamela as well as the entire class. The positive feedback she received encouraged her to expand her talks to wider audiences, including a panel discussion about the diarist Anne Frank, who died in German captivity.

Butter is a professor emerita of health management and policy at the University of Michigan and continues to publish academic papers.

Legacy 
 Co-founded the Raoul Wallenberg Lectures at the University of Michigan, which honors the Swedish diplomat who is known to have saved thousands of Jews.
 Participates in Zeituna, an Arab-Jewish dialogue group of women.

Selected publications 
 Butter, Irene Hasenberg. Economics of graduate education: an exploratory study. University of Michigan, Department of Economics, 1966.
 Butter, Irene. "The migratory flow of doctors to and from the United States." Medical care (1971): 17-31.
 Butter, Irene, and Richard Schaffner. "Foreign medical graduates and equal access to medical care." Medical Care (1971): 136-143.
 Butter, Irene H. "Premature adoption and routinization of medical technology: Illustrations from childbirth technology." Journal of Social Issues 49, no. 2 (1993): 11-34.
 Butter, Irene and John D. Bedwell - Co-author: Kris Holloway, Shores beyond Shores, From Holocaust to Hope, My True Story, Uitgave Can of Worms, Londen/NY, Nov. 2019, .
 Never a Bystander (2014) short documentary film about Butter by American filmmaker Evelyn Neuhaus.

References

External links 
 Website Irene Butter

   

1930 births
Living people
People from Berlin
Holocaust survivors
University of Michigan alumni
Queens College, City University of New York alumni
Westerbork transit camp survivors
Bergen-Belsen concentration camp
Bergen-Belsen concentration camp survivors